The Texas Rangers finished the 2006 season in 3rd place of the West Division of the American League. They had two players feature in the 2006 All-Star Game: Michael Young who in his 3rd appearance was named the All Star Game's Most Valuable Player; and Gary Matthews Jr. making his first appearance.

Offseason
December 8, 2005: Termel Sledge was traded by the Washington Nationals with Armando Galarraga and Brad Wilkerson to the Texas Rangers for Alfonso Soriano.
January 6, 2006: Termel Sledge was traded by the Texas Rangers with Adrian Gonzalez and Chris Young to the San Diego Padres for Billy Killian (minors), Adam Eaton and Akinori Otsuka.

Regular season

Opening Day starters

Rod Barajas, C
Mark Teixeira, 1B
Ian Kinsler, 2B*
Hank Blalock, 3B
Michael Young, SS
Brad Wilkerson, LF
Laynce Nix, CF
Kevin Mench, RF
Phil Nevin, DH
Kevin Millwood, RHP

*Rookie

Season standings

Record vs. opponents

Notable transactions
 July 28, 2006: Carlos Lee was traded by the Milwaukee Brewers with Nelson Cruz to the Texas Rangers for Laynce Nix, Kevin Mench, Francisco Cordero, and Julian Cordero (minors).
 August 4, 2006: Randall Simon was signed as a free agent with the Texas Rangers.
September 1, 2006: Randall Simon was purchased by the Philadelphia Phillies from the Texas Rangers.

Roster

Game log

|- style="background-color:#ffbbbb"
| 1 || April 3 || Red Sox || 7–3 || Schilling || Millwood (0–1) || || 51,541 || 0–1
|- style="background-color:#bbffbb"
| 2 || April 4 || Red Sox || 10–4 || Padilla (1–0) || Wakefield || || 29,442 || 1–1
|- style="background-color:#ffbbbb"
| 3 || April 5 || Red Sox || 2–1 || Beckett || Loe (0–1) || Papelbon || 32,416 || 1–2
|- style="background-color:#ffbbbb"
| 4 || April 6 || Tigers || 10–6 || Robertson || Dickey (0–1) || || 21,713 || 1–3
|- style="background-color:#ffbbbb"
| 5 || April 7 || Tigers || 5–2 || Maroth || Koronka (0–1) || Rodney || 21,155 || 1–4
|- style="background-color:#ffbbbb"
| 6 || April 8 || Tigers || 7–0 || Verlander || Millwood (0–2) || || 35,066 || 1–5
|- style="background-color:#bbffbb"
| 7 || April 9 || Tigers || 5–3 || Padilla (2–0) || Rogers || Cordero (1) || 31,032 || 2–5
|- style="background-color:#ffbbbb"
| 8 || April 10 || @ Angels || 5–2 || Lackey || Loe (0–2) || Rodríguez || 38,003 || 2–6
|- style="background-color:#ffbbbb"
| 9 || April 11 || @ Angels || 5–4 || Romero || Cordero (0–1) || || 40,012 || 2–7
|- style="background-color:#bbffbb"
| 10 || April 12 || @ Angels || 11–3 || Koronka (1–1) || Escobar || || 42,911 || 3–7
|- style="background-color:#bbffbb"
| 11 || April 14 || @ Athletics || 6–3 || Millwood (1–2) || Zito || || 14,049 || 4–7
|- style="background-color:#ffbbbb"
| 12 || April 15 || @ Athletics || 5–4 || Harden || Padilla (2–1) || Street || 16,186 || 4–8
|- style="background-color:#bbffbb"
| 13 || April 16 || @ Athletics || 5–3 || Cordero (1–1) || Street || || 21,256 || 5–8
|- style="background-color:#bbffbb"
| 14 || April 18 || @ Mariners || 7–4 || Koronka (2–1) || Hernández || Cordero (2) || 17,927 || 6–8
|- style="background-color:#ffbbbb"
| 15 || April 19 || @ Mariners || 9–6 || Putz || Cordero (1–2)|| || 17,613 || 6–9
|- style="background-color:#bbffbb"
| 16 || April 20 || @ Mariners || 4–3 || Bauer (1–0) || Guardado || Cordero (3) || 17,917 || 7–9
|- style="background-color:#bbffbb"
| 17 || April 21 || Devil Rays || 13–7 || Wilson (1–0) || McClung || || 25,129 || 8–9
|- style="background-color:#bbffbb"
| 18 || April 22 || Devil Rays || 6–5 || Cordero (2–2) || Orvella || || 35,302 || 9–9
|- style="background-color:#bbffbb"
| 19 || April 23 || Devil Rays || 8–3 || Koronka (3–1) || Fossum || || 29,232 || 10–9
|- style="background-color:#ffbbbb"
| 20 || April 24 || Athletics || 3–2 || Blanton || Wilson (1–1) || Duchscherer || 23,802 || 10–10
|- style="background-color:#bbffbb"
| 21 || April 25 || Athletics || 6–5 || Cordero (3–2) || Gaudin || || 25,492 || 11–10
|- style="background-color:#ffbbbb"
| 22 || April 26 || Athletics || 6–4 || Duchscherer || Wilson (1–2) || Kennedy || 23,756 || 11–11
|- style="background-color:#ffbbbb"
| 23 || April 28 || @ Indians || 7–6 || Davis || Bauer (1–1) || Wickman || 22,106 || 11–12
|- style="background-color:#bbffbb"
| 24 || April 29 || @ Indians || 7–5 || Millwood (2–2) || Carmona|| Otsuka (1) || 37,496 || 12–12
|- style="background-color:#bbffbb"
| 25 || April 30 || @ Indians || 8–4 || Padilla (3–1) || Davis || || 22,989 || 13–12

|- style="background-color:#bbffbb"
| 26 || May 1 || @ Devil Rays || 3–0 || Loe (1–2) || McClung || Otsuka (2) || 7,295 || 14–12
|- style="background-color:#bbffbb"
| 27 || May 2 || @ Devil Rays || 7–5 || Tejeda (1–0) || Hendrickson || Otsuka (3) || 7,147 || 15–12
|- style="background-color:#bbffbb"
| 28 || May 3 || Orioles || 2–1 || Bauer (2–1) || Halama || || 23,783 || 16–12
|- style="background-color:#bbffbb"
| 29 || May 4 || Orioles || 8–2 || Millwood (3–2) || Chen || || 21,962 || 17–12
|- style="background-color:#ffbbbb"
| 30 || May 5 || Yankees || 8–7 || Mussina || Padilla (3–2) || Rivera || 39,002 || 17–13
|- style="background-color:#ffbbbb"
| 31 || May 6 || Yankees || 6–1 || Chacón || Loe (1–3) || || 48,634 || 17–14
|- style="background-color:#ffbbbb"
| 32 || May 7 || Yankees || 8–5 || Wang || Tejeda (1–1) || || 46,013 || 17–15
|- style="background-color:#bbffbb"
| 33 || May 8 || Twins || 6–4 || Koronka (4–1) || Radke || Otsuka (4) || 18,608 || 18–15
|- style="background-color:#ffbbbb"
| 34 || May 9 || Twins || 15–5 || Silva || Millwood (3–3) || Liriano || 19,309 || 18–16
|- style="background-color:#ffbbbb"
| 35 || May 10 || Twins || 4–3 || Lohse || Padilla (3–3) || Nathan || 23,037 || 18–17
|- style="background-color:#bbffbb"
| 36 || May 12 || @ Red Sox || 6–0 || Loe (2–3) || Clement || || 36,102 || 19–17
|- style="background-color:#bbbbbb"
| – || May 13 || @ Red Sox || colspan=5|Postponed || 19–17
|- style="background-color:#bbbbbb"
| – || May 14 || @ Red Sox || colspan=5|Postponed || 19–17
|- style="background-color:#bbffbb"
| 37 || May 15 || @ Yankees || 4–2 || Millwood (4–3) || Farnsworth || Otsuka (5) || 41,115 || 20–17
|- style="background-color:#ffbbbb"
| 38 || May 16 || @ Yankees || 14–13 || Rivera || Otsuka (0–1) || || 40,757 || 20–18
|- style="background-color:#ffbbbb"
| 39 || May 17 || @ Yankees || 4–3 || Wang || Loe (2–4) || Rivera || 52,547 || 20–19
|- style="background-color:#bbffbb"
| 40 || May 18 || @ Yankees || 6–2 || Padilla (4–3) || Wright || || 47,194 || 21–19
|- style="background-color:#ffbbbb"
| 41 || May 19 || @ Astros || 5–3 || Qualls || Benoit (0–1) || Lidge || 40,790 || 21–20
|- style="background-color:#bbffbb"
| 42 || May 20 || @ Astros || 6–0 || Millwood (5–3) || Pettitte || || 41,480 || 22–20
|- style="background-color:#ffbbbb"
| 43 || May 21 || @ Astros || 5–0 || Buchholz || Koronka (4–2) || || 37,979 || 22–21
|- style="background-color:#bbffbb"
| 44 || May 22 || Angels || 3–2 || Loe (3–4) || Escobar || Otsuka (6) || 22,032 || 23–21
|- style="background-color:#ffbbbb"
| 45 || May 23 || Angels || 7–6 || Carrasco || Cordero (3–3) || Rodríguez || 21,833 || 23–22
|- style="background-color:#ffbbbb"
| 46 || May 24 || Angels || 8–5 || Weaver || Tejeda (1–2) || || 16,536 || 23–23
|- style="background-color:#bbffbb"
| 47 || May 25 || Athletics || 8–7 || Otsuka (1–1) || Street || || 22,006 || 24–23
|- style="background-color:#bbffbb"
| 48 || May 26 || Athletics || 5–3 || Cordero (4–3) || Gaudin || Otsuka (7) || 27,791 || 25–23
|- style="background-color:#ffbbbb"
| 49 || May 27 || Athletics || 6–3 || Zito || Loe (3–5) || Street || 41,226 || 25–24
|- style="background-color:#bbffbb"
| 50 || May 28 || Athletics || 4–3 || Padilla (5–3) || Saarloos || Otsuka (8) || 38,905 || 26–24
|- style="background-color:#bbffbb"
| 51 || May 29 || Mariners || 2–0 || Rheinecker (1–0) || Washburn || Bauer (1) || 23,771 || 27–24
|- style="background-color:#bbffbb"
| 52 || May 30 || Mariners || 6–4 || Millwood (6–3) || Meche || Otsuka (9) || 18,084 || 28–24
|- style="background-color:#ffbbbb"
| 53 || May 31 || Mariners || 14–5 || Hernández || Koronka (4–3) || || 19,131 || 28–25

|- style="background-color:#bbffbb"
| 54 || June 2 || @ White Sox || 4–3 || Cordero (5–3) || McCarthy || Otsuka (10) || 32,802 || 29–25
|- style="background-color:#ffbbbb"
| 55 || June 3 || @ White Sox || 8–6 || Vázquez || Padilla (5–4) || Jenks || 38,697 || 29–26
|- style="background-color:#bbffbb"
| 56 || June 4 || @ White Sox || 10–2 || Rheinecker (2–0) || Buehrle || || 35,915 || 30–26
|- style="background-color:#bbffbb"
| 57 || June 6 || @ Royals || 6–2 || Millwood (7–3) || Elarton || Cordero (4) || 11,715 || 31–26
|- style="background-color:#bbffbb"
| 58 || June 7 || @ Royals || 4–2 || Otsuka (2–1) || Burgos || Cordero (5) || 11,246 || 32–26
|- style="background-color:#ffbbbb"
| 59 || June 8 || @ Royals || 16–12 || Gobble || Mahay (0–1) || || 11,815 || 32–27
|- style="background-color:#ffbbbb"
| 60 || June 9 || @ Red Sox || 4–3 || Papelbon || Cordero (5–4) || || 36,133 || 32–28
|- style="background-color:#bbffbb"
| 61 || June 10 || @ Red Sox || 7–4 || Corey (1–0) || Tavárez || Otsuka (11) || 36,920 || 33–28
|- style="background-color:#bbbbbb"
| – || June 10 || @ Red Sox || colspan=5|Postponed || 33–28
|- style="background-color:#ffbbbb"
| 62 || June 11 || @ Red Sox || 5–4 || Delcarmen || Otsuka (2–2) || || 36,232 || 33–29
|- style="background-color:#bbffbb"
| 63 || June 11 || @ Red Sox || 13–6 || Wasdin (1–0) || Pauley || || 35,602 || 34–29
|- style="background-color:#ffbbbb"
| 64 || June 12 || @ White Sox || 8–3 || Contreras || Koronka (4–4) || || 29,182 || 34–30
|- style="background-color:#ffbbbb"
| 65 || June 13 || @ White Sox || 5–2 || Garland || Loe (3–6) || Jenks || 18,354 || 34–31
|- style="background-color:#bbffbb"
| 66 || June 14 || @ White Sox || 8–0 || Padilla (6–4) || Vázquez || || 28,776 || 35–31
|- style="background-color:#ffbbbb"
| 67 || June 15 || @ White Sox || 8–2 || Buehrle || Rheinecker (2–1) || || 19,424 || 35–32
|- style="background-color:#bbffbb"
| 68 || June 16 || Diamondbacks || 5–3 || Millwood (8–3) || Webb || Otsuka (12) || 28,167 || 36–32
|- style="background-color:#bbffbb"
| 69 || June 17 || Diamondbacks || 8–4 || Koronka (5–4) || Jarvis || || 41,165 || 37–32
|- style="background-color:#bbffbb"
| 70 || June 18 || Diamondbacks || 10–7 || Cordero (6–4) || Vizcaíno || Otsuka (13) || 24,358 || 38–32
|- style="background-color:#ffbbbb"
| 71 || June 20 || Padres || 6–5 || Thompson || Feldman (0–1) || Hoffman || 24,064 || 38–33
|- style="background-color:#ffbbbb"
| 72 || June 21 || Padres || 3–2 || Linebrink || Otsuka (2–3) || Hoffman || 29,047 || 38–34
|- style="background-color:#bbffbb"
| 73 || June 22 || Padres || 5–3 || Rheinecker (3–1) || Hensley || Otsuka (14) || 24,637 || 39–34
|- style="background-color:#bbffbb"
| 74 || June 23 || @ Rockies || 8–6 || Koronka (6–4) || Francis || Otsuka (15) || 28,360 || 40–34
|- style="background-color:#ffbbbb"
| 75 || June 24 || @ Rockies || 11–6 || Fogg || Tejeda (1–3) || || 31,439 || 40–35
|- style="background-color:#ffbbbb"
| 76 || June 25 || @ Rockies || 3–0 || Kim || Padilla (6–5) || Fuentes || 28,313 || 40–36
|- style="background-color:#ffbbbb"
| 77 || June 27 || @ Giants || 5–3 || Morris || Millwood (8–4) || Accardo || 36,053 || 40–37
|- style="background-color:#ffbbbb"
| 78 || June 28 || @ Giants || 5–1 || Lowry || Rheinecker (3–2) || || 37,275 || 40–38
|- style="background-color:#ffbbbb"
| 79 || June 29 || @ Giants || 2–1 || Sánchez || Feldman (0–2) || Accardo || 38,212 || 40–39
|- style="background-color:#bbffbb"
| 80 || June 30 || Astros || 3–1 || Padilla (7–5) || Oswalt || Otsuka (16) || 40,177 || 41–39

|- style="background-color:#ffbbbb"
| 81 || July 1 || Astros || 7–0 || Buchholz || Wasdin (1–1) || || 35,131 || 41–40
|- style="background-color:#ffbbbb"
| 82 || July 2 || Astros || 9–5 || Rodríguez || Millwood (8–5) || Lidge || 39,298 || 41–41
|- style="background-color:#bbffbb"
| 83 || July 3 || Blue Jays || 6–1 || Rheinecker (4–2) || Lilly || || 30,021 || 42–41
|- style="background-color:#ffbbbb"
| 84 || July 4 || Blue Jays || 3–2 || Halladay || Koronka (6–5) || Ryan || 42,255 || 42–42
|- style="background-color:#bbffbb"
| 85 || July 5 || Blue Jays || 9–3 || Padilla (8–5) || Janssen || Cordero (6) || 25,803 || 43–42
|- style="background-color:#bbffbb"
| 86 || July 7 || Twins || 9–4 || Wasdin (2–1) || Silva || || 30,207 || 44–42
|- style="background-color:#ffbbbb"
| 87 || July 8 || Twins || 4–0 || Liriano || Rheinecker (4–3) || || 36,035 || 44–43
|- style="background-color:#bbffbb"
| 88 || July 9 || Twins || 5–2 || Bauer (3–1) || Santana || Otsuka (17) || 23,268 || 45–43
|- style="background-color:#bbffbb"
| 89 || July 13 || @ Orioles || 15–1 || Padilla (9–5) || Cabrera || || 22,780 || 46–43
|- style="background-color:#bbffbb"
| 90 || July 14 || @ Orioles || 2–1 || Millwood (9–5) || Benson || Otsuka (18) || 28,201 || 47–43
|- style="background-color:#ffbbbb"
| 91 || July 15 || @ Orioles || 8–1 || Bédard || Rheinecker (4–4) || || 35,804 || 47–44
|- style="background-color:#ffbbbb"
| 92 || July 16 || @ Orioles || 4–0 || López || Wasdin (2–2) || || 25,169 || 47–45
|- style="background-color:#ffbbbb"
| 93 || July 17 || @ Blue Jays || 10–1 || Lilly || Koronka (6–6) || || 16,872 || 47–46
|- style="background-color:#bbffbb"
| 94 || July 18 || @ Blue Jays || 5–2 || Padilla (10–5) || Schoeneweis || Otsuka (19) || 20,017 || 48–46
|- style="background-color:#bbffbb"
| 95 || July 19 || @ Blue Jays || 5–4 || Millwood (10–5) || Janssen || Otsuka (20) || 20,778 || 49–46
|- style="background-color:#ffbbbb"
| 96 || July 20 || @ Red Sox || 6–4 || Schilling || Corey (1–1) || Timlin || 36,489 || 49–47
|- style="background-color:#bbffbb"
| 97 || July 21 || @ White Sox || 10–3 || Mahay (1–1) || Buehrle || Bauer (2) || 38,246 || 50–47
|- style="background-color:#bbffbb"
| 98 || July 22 || @ White Sox || 3–1 || Cordero (7–4) || Jenks || Otsuka (21) || 39,250 || 51–47
|- style="background-color:#ffbbbb"
| 99 || July 23 || @ White Sox || 5–0 || Garland || Padilla (10–6) || || 38,312 || 51–48
|- style="background-color:#ffbbbb"
| 100 || July 24 || Yankees || 6–2 || Johnson || Millwood (10–6) || || 43,206 || 51–49
|- style="background-color:#ffbbbb"
| 101 || July 25 || Yankees || 7–4 || Mussina || Eaton (0–1) || Rivera || 42,171 || 51–50
|- style="background-color:#ffbbbb"
| 102 || July 26 || Yankees || 8–7 || Chacón || Otsuka (2–4) || Rivera || 43,527 || 51–51
|- style="background-color:#ffbbbb"
| 103 || July 28 || Royals || 11–3 || Hudson || Padilla (10–7) || || 30,202 || 51–52
|- style="background-color:#ffbbbb"
| 104 || July 29 || Royals || 5–3 || de la Rosa || Millwood (10–7) || Burgos || 42,017 || 51–53
|- style="background-color:#bbffbb"
| 105 || July 30 || Royals || 15–2 || Koronka (7–6) || Redman || || 29,726 || 52–53
|- style="background-color:#ffbbbb"
| 106 || July 31 || @ Twins || 15–2 || Silva || Rheinecker (4–5) || || 19,532 || 52–54

|- style="background-color:#bbffbb"
| 107 || August 1 || @ Twins || 9–0 || Eaton (1–1) || Baker || || 25,969 || 53–54
|- style="background-color:#bbffbb"
| 108 || August 2 || @ Twins || 10–2 || Wells (1–0) || Bonser || || 26,492 || 54–54
|- style="background-color:#bbffbb"
| 109 || August 3 || @ Angels || 7–6 || Littleton (1–0) || Gregg || Otsuka (22) || 43,569 || 55–54
|- style="background-color:#bbffbb"
| 110 || August 4 || @ Angels || 7–3 || Padilla (11–7) || Lackey || || 44,074 || 56–54
|- style="background-color:#ffbbbb"
| 111 || August 5 || @ Angels || 10–3 ||Santana || Koronka (7–7) || || 43,701 || 56–55
|- style="background-color:#ffbbbb"
| 112 || August 6 || @ Angels || 9–1 || Saunders || Eaton (1–2) || || 43,804 || 56–56
|- style="background-color:#ffbbbb"
| 113 || August 7 || @ Athletics || 7–4 || Loaiza || Vólquez (0–1) || Calero || 21,208 || 56–57
|- style="background-color:#ffbbbb"
| 114 || August 8 || @ Athletics || 7–6 || Saarloos || Millwood (10–8) || Street || 21,650 || 56–58
|- style="background-color:#bbffbb"
| 115 || August 9 || @ Athletics || 14–0 || Padilla (12–7) || Zito || || 30,127 || 58–57
|- style="background-color:#bbffbb"
| 116 || August 10 || Mariners || 8–2 || Eaton (2–2) || Piñeiro || || 31,763 || 58–58
|- style="background-color:#bbffbb"
| 117 || August 11 || Mariners || 14–7 || Littleton (2–0) || Meche || || 28,207 || 59–58
|- style="background-color:#bbffbb"
| 118 || August 12 || Mariners || 5–4 || Vólquez (1–1) || Moyer || Otsuka (23) || 35,784 || 60–58
|- style="background-color:#bbffbb"
| 119 || August 13 || Mariners || 10–6 || Millwood (11–8) || Hernández || || 29,717 || 61–58
|- style="background-color:#ffbbbb"
| 120 || August 15 || Angels || 9–7 || Carrasco || Littleton (2–1) || Rodríguez || 26,561 || 61–59
|- style="background-color:#bbffbb"
| 121 || August 16 || Angels || 9–3 || Eaton (3–2) || Saunders || || 31,723 || 62–59
|- style="background-color:#ffbbbb"
| 122 || August 17 || @ Tigers || 4–2 || Rogers || Vólquez (1–2) || Jones || 34,756 || 62–60
|- style="background-color:#bbffbb"
| 123 || August 18 || @ Tigers || 2–1 || Millwood (12–8) || Miner || Otsuka (24) || 39,327 || 63–60
|- style="background-color:#bbffbb"
| 124 || August 19 || @ Tigers || 3–1 || Tejeda (2–3) || Robertson || Otsuka (25) || 41,643 || 64–60
|- style="background-color:#bbffbb"
| 125 || August 20 || @ Tigers || 7–6 || Benoit (1–1) || Grilli || Otsuka (26) || 39,071 || 65–60
|- style="background-color:#ffbbbb"
| 126 || August 21 || @ Devil Rays || 4–3 || Shields || Eaton (3–2) || McClung || 7,820 || 65–61
|- style="background-color:#ffbbbb"
| 127 || August 22 || @ Devil Rays || 5–3 || Camp || Padilla (12–8) || McClung || 8,028 || 65–62
|- style="background-color:#ffbbbb"
| 128 || August 23 || @ Devil Rays || 7–3 || Camp || Millwood (12–9) || || 9,701 || 65–63
|- style="background-color:#bbffbb"
| 129 || August 24 || @ Devil Rays || 4–3 || Tejeda (3–3) || Corcoran || Otsuka (27) || 9,454 || 66–63
|- style="background-color:#ffbbbb"
| 130 || August 25 || Athletics || 9–3 || Zito || Vólquez (1–3) || || 31,178 || 66–64
|- style="background-color:#ffbbbb"
| 131 || August 26 || Athletics || 5–3 || Blanton || Eaton (3–4) || Duchscherer || 37,752 || 66–65
|- style="background-color:#bbffbb"
| 132 || August 27 || Athletics || 3–0 || Padilla (13–8) || Haren || Otsuka (28) || 25,708 || 67–65
|- style="background-color:#bbffbb"
| 133 || August 29 || Orioles || 9–4 || Millwood (13–9) || López || || 23,684 || 68–65
|- style="background-color:#ffbbbb"
| 134 || August 30 || Orioles || 7–4 || Hawkins || Mahay (1–2) || || 23,812 || 68–66
|- style="background-color:#bbffbb"
| 135 || August 31 || Orioles || 7–5 || Eaton (4–4) || Cabrera || Otsuka (29) || 21,446 || 69–66

|- style="background-color:#ffbbbb"
| 136 || September 1 || Indians || 7–2 || Westbrook || Padilla (13–9) || || 23,776 || 69–67
|- style="background-color:#ffbbbb"
| 137 || September 2 || Indians || 6–5 || Lee || Vólquez (1–4) || Mastny || 40,222 || 69–68
|- style="background-color:#bbffbb"
| 138 || September 3 || Indians || 5–2 || Millwood (14–9) || Byrd || Otsuka (30) || 19,667 || 70–68
|- style="background-color:#bbffbb"
| 139 || September 4 || @ Athletics || 8–1 || Tejeda (4–3) || Zito || || 23,949 || 71–68
|- style="background-color:#bbffbb"
| 140 || September 5 || @ Athletics || 5–4 || Eaton (5–4) || Saarloos || Otsuka (31) || 27,225 || 72–68
|- style="background-color:#ffbbbb"
| 141 || September 6 || @ Athletics || 9–6 || Blanton || Rupe (0–1) || Duchscherer || 17,838 || 72–69
|- style="background-color:#ffbbbb"
| 142 || September 8 || @ Mariners || 7–2 || Baek || Millwood (14–10) || Piñeiro || 28,646 || 72–70
|- style="background-color:#ffbbbb"
| 143 || September 9 || @ Mariners || 3–2 || Fruto || Rheinecker (4–6) || || 33,454 || 72–71
|- style="background-color:#bbffbb"
| 144 || September 10 || @ Mariners || 4–2 || Wilson (2–2) || Huber || Otsuka (32) || 34,321 || 73–71
|- style="background-color:#ffbbbb"
| 145 || September 12 || @ Tigers || 3–2 || Rodney || Mahay (1–3) || || 24,196 || 73–72
|- style="background-color:#bbffbb"
| 146 || September 13 || @ Tigers || 11–3 || Millwood (15–10) || Verlander || || 24,672 || 74–72
|- style="background-color:#ffbbbb"
| 147 || September 14 || Angels || 2–1 || Carrasco || Vólquez (1–5) || Rodríguez || 21,488 || 74–73
|- style="background-color:#ffbbbb"
| 148 || September 15 || Angels || 2–1 || Donnelly || Francisco (0–1) || || 30,788 || 74–74
|- style="background-color:#bbffbb"
| 149 || September 16 || Angels || 12–6 || Eaton (6–4) || Lackey || || 40,196 || 75–74
|- style="background-color:#bbffbb"
| 150 || September 17 || Angels || 8–1 || Padilla (14–9) || Santana || || 24,303 || 76–74
|- style="background-color:#bbffbb"
| 151 || September 18 || Mariners || 8–1 || Millwood (16–10) || Hernández || || 18,214 || 77–74
|- style="background-color:#ffbbbb"
| 152 || September 19 || Mariners || 9–7 || Huber || Wilson (2–3) || Putz || 18,551 || 77–75
|- style="background-color:#ffbbbb"
| 153 || September 20 || Mariners || 6–3 || Baek || Tejeda (4–4) || Putz || 26,006 || 77–76
|- style="background-color:#bbffbb"
| 154 || September 22 || Indians || 12–4 || Eaton (7–4) || Byrd || || 26,284 || 78–76
|- style="background-color:#ffbbbb"
| 155 || September 23 || Indians || 6–3 || Miller || Padilla (14–10) || Betancourt || 38,351 || 78–77
|- style="background-color:#ffbbbb"
| 156 || September 24 || Indians || 11–6 || Westbrook || Millwood (16–11) || || 36,617 || 78–78
|- style="background-color:#ffbbbb"
| 157 || September 25 || @ Angels || 8–3 || Saunders || Vólquez (1–6) || Shields || 39,781 || 78–79
|- style="background-color:#bbffbb"
| 158 || September 26 || @ Angels || 5–2 || Tejeda (5–4) || Escobar || Littleton (1) || 37,339 || 79–79
|- style="background-color:#ffbbbb"
| 159 || September 27 || @ Angels || 6–5 || Donnelly || Wilson (2–4) || Rodríguez || 38,032 || 79–80
|- style="background-color:#bbffbb"
| 160 || September 29 || @ Mariners || 6–5 || Padilla (15–10) || Fruto || Wilson (1) || 30,766 || 80–80
|- style="background-color:#ffbbbb"
| 161 || September 30 || @ Mariners || 3–1 || Hernández || Millwood (16–12) || Putz || 23,310 || 80–81
|- style="background-color:#ffbbbb"
| 162 || October 1 || @ Mariners || 3–2 || Woods || Tejeda (5–5) || Putz || 28,361 || 80–82

Player stats

Batting

Starters by position
Note: Pos = Position; G = Games played; AB = At bats; H = Hits; Avg. = Batting average; HR = Home runs; RBI = Runs batted in

Other batters
Note: G = Games played; AB = At bats; H = Hits; Avg. = Batting average; HR = Home runs; RBI = Runs batted in

Pitching

Starting pitchers
Note: G = Games pitched; IP = Innings pitched; W = Wins; L = Losses; ERA = Earned run average; SO = Strikeouts

Other pitchers
Note: G = Games pitched; IP = Innings pitched; W = Wins; L = Losses; ERA = Earned run average; SO = Strikeouts

Relief pitchers
Note: G = Games pitched; W = Wins; L = Losses; SV = Saves; ERA = Earned run average; SO = Strikeouts

Team statistics
Positions in brackets are in league with other MLB teams

Batting
Note: G = Games played; AB = At bats; H = Hits; R = Runs; Avg. = Batting average; HR = Home runs; RBI = Runs batted in

Pitching
Note: G = Games pitched; IP = Innings pitched; W = Wins; L = Losses; ERA = Earned run average; SO = Strikeouts; SHO = Shutouts

Awards and honors
Mark Teixeira, 1B, Gold Glove
All-Star Game

Farm system

References

External links
2006 Texas Rangers at Baseball Reference
2006 Texas Rangers team page at www.baseball-almanac.com

Texas Rangers seasons
Texas Rangers
Texas Rangers